Byttneria asplundii is a species of flowering plant in the family Malvaceae. It is found only in Ecuador. Its natural habitats are subtropical or tropical dry forests, subtropical or tropical moist lowland forests, and subtropical or tropical moist montane forests.

References

asplundii
Endemic flora of Ecuador
Endangered plants
Taxonomy articles created by Polbot
Plants described in 1976